Vinu Jose is an Indian football player, who took part in the FIFA World Cup 2006 Group 3 matches against Oman and Singapore. He represented the Indian team four times.

Vinu Jose was also part of Kerala's winning team in the 57th Santosh Trophy National football championship.

Vinu Jose is among the few Keralites who played in the East Bengal professional football squad alongside I M Vijayan and Jo Paul Ancheri at the turn of the millennium.

Early life 
Vinu Jose was born in Thiruvananthapuram, Kerala. In addition to football, Vinu also represented his school in athletics. Vinu did his early schooling in 
Sarvodaya Vidyalaya and later in  St.Joseph's High School in Thiruvananthapuram. He moved to Tata Football Academy where he was groomed into a professional football player.

Professional Club Statistics

International Match Statistics

Professional Coaching Career

Vinu Jose holds an AFC C-License and could serve only serve as the assistant coach of I-League club since the All India Football Federation mandates a A-License for head coaches in the I-League.

References 

Vinu Jose

Footballer Vinu Jose on a Distinct Career Path

1981 births
India international footballers
Indian footballers
Footballers from Kerala
Living people
Association football defenders